List of general syndics of the General Council of the Valleys (Andorra). The general syndic is the speaker of the Andorran parliament. Below is a list of office-holders:

Roser Suñé Pascuet, on April 3, 2019, became the first female to hold the office of General Syndic in Andorra's history.

See also
List of first syndics of the General Council

Footnotes and references 

Andorra politics-related lists

Andorra